Sebastian Copeland (born 3 April 1964) is a British-American-French photographer, polar explorer, author, lecturer, and environmental advocate. He has led numerous expeditions in the polar regions to photograph and film endangered environments. In 2017, Copeland was named one of the world's top 25 adventurers of the last 25 years by Men's Journal. He is a fellow of The Explorers Club. His documentary Into the Cold was a featured selection at the 2010 Tribeca Film Festival and was released on DVD timed to Earth Day 2011.

Early life and education
Copeland is the son of the director of the Lille National Philharmonic Orchestra, Jean-Claude Casadesus. He graduated from UCLA in 1987.

Career
Copeland began his career in New York City directing music videos before moving on to commercial directing as well as professional photography with credits including fashion and advertising, album covers, and celebrities.

Since 2000, Copeland has focused his work on climate change. His prints have appeared in exhibitions including the United Nations (Solo Show, 2007), the Council on Foreign Relations, and the Peabody Essex Museum as well as the Field Museum of Natural History in Chicago. His work is included in The Natural World Museum in San Francisco's permanent archive. In 2006 and 2007 prints from his first book, Antarctica: The Global Warning, were selected to tour with the International Photography Awards' "Best in Show" world tour.

Copeland writes for Men's Journal and Huffington Post. He has made keynote addresses at the United Nations and think tank The Planetworkshops.

He spent 15 years on the board of directors for Global Green and is a founding member of Artists for Amazonia.

Expeditions
In 2005, Copeland led a media initiative in the Arctic in defense of the Inuit's loss of culture from climate change for Global Green USA.

In 2006 and 2007, Copeland spent two seasons aboard the scientific research ice breaker The Ice Lady Patagonia in the Antarctic Peninsula.

In 2008, Copeland and partner Luc Hardy led a group of nine children from international backgrounds to the northernmost edge of the Canadian arctic, on Ellesmere island.

In 2009 Copeland mounted an expedition to the North Pole to commemorate the centennial of Admiral Robert Peary’s expedition in 1909.
Footage of the expedition was used in the documentary Into the Cold: A Journey of the Soul, which debuted at the Tribeca Film Festival in 2010.

In 2010, Copeland traversed 2,300 kilometers of Greenland's ice flats from south to north on a Kite skiing expedition. His expedition was meant to raise awareness of global warming. He documented the journey with his camera and posted live updates through Facebook and Twitter.
The expedition lasted 44 days and earned Copeland and partner Eric McNair Landry the new kite skiing distance World Record by covering the longest distance in a 24-hour period: 595 kilometers.

Copeland led the Antarctica 2011–2012 Legacy Crossing. Over 82 days between 4 November 2011 and 24 January 2012 Sebastian and partner Eric McNair-Landry were the first to cross the Antarctica icecap from east to west via two of its poles. They used kites and skis, setting three new polar records in the process. Pulling  of supplies each, they were the first to reach the Antarctica Pole of Inaccessibility (POI) from the Novolazarevskaya station on Antarctica's East coast by non-motorized means and without assistance. They were also the first to link the POI to the South Pole without motorized transportation. On 24 January 2012, they finally reached Hercules Inlet, effectively linking the eastern and western coast of Antarctica after covering an adjusted distance of about 4,100 kilometers.

In August 2016 Copeland and partner Mark George crossed Australia's Simpson Desert on foot and without support, pulling all water and supplies on two-wheels carts. Their 651 km west-to-east crossing was the longest latitudinal traverse without motorized transportation.

In 2017, Copeland and partner Mark George attempted an unsupported mission on foot from Canada to the North Pole. Equipment failure and severe frostbites forced the team to abort mission after two days during a −60C cold spell.

Recent activities

Copeland is a mountain and climbing enthusiast.

In 2005, Sebastian co-organized a media initiative in the Arctic with Global Green USA in defense of the Inuit's cultural loss to climate change. After two trips to Antarctica, in 2006 and 2007, he decided to try to combine fine art photography, adventure and environmental concerns. In 2007, Copeland released his first book Antarctica: The Global Warning followed in 2009 with Antarctica: A Call To Action.

In 2013, in Copeland completed his second documentary, Across The Ice: The Greenland Victory March.

In 2015, Copeland published his third monogram, Arctica: The Vanishing North published by teNeues, representing 10 years of Arctic travel. Arctica is a comprehensive visual record of the North Pole, including a foreword by Sir Richard Branson and accompanying texts by Andrew J. Weaver, Dr. Ted Scambos, Mayor Eric Garcetti, Sheila Watt-Cloutier and Børge Ousland. Copeland was named Photographer of the Year by the Tokyo Int'l Photo Awards for this book.

In 2018, Copeland was given a public exhibit by the French Senate. The show of eighty panels seen by an estimated four million visitors over four months along the gates of the Luxembourg gardens in Paris.

Copeland currently lives in Los Angeles. He continues to lead expeditions to remote parts of the world to which he hopes will increase awareness of global warming.

Awards and honors

Selected photography awards
 2007: International Photography Awards (IPA) --Professional Photographer of the Year Book Category for Antarctica: The Global Warning
 2008: Prix Pictet—Shortlist finalist
 2011: Px3 Prix de la Photographie Paris—Gold Award – Professional Press Nature/Environmental Category 
 2012: Arctic Awards – FIAP Medal & PSA The Arctic ribbon
 2016 Tokyo Int'l Photography Award— Photographer of the Year for the book Arctica: The Vanishing North
 2020: International Photography Award (IPA) Professional Book Photographer of the Year — Antarctica: The Waking Giant https://www.photoawards.com/winner/?compName=IPA+2020

Others
 2008 GQ Germany: Man Of The Year—Engagement
 2010 Gala Award, Germany – Environmental Stewardship
 2014 green good design copeland Award 2014 from the Chicago Athenaeum Museum of Architecture & Design
 2018 Germany's BAMBI award, in the "Our Earth" category
2019 Knighted in the National Order of Merit by French President Emmanuel Macron

Selected exhibitions
 2007: Salon Imperial, Paris,  Antarctica: The Global Warning Nov. 27th-16 December 2007
 2008: Jan Kesner Gallery Los Angeles,  Antarctica: The Global Warning Nov. 2007 – Jan. 2008
 2008: Flo Peters Gallery Hamburg Germany, Antarctica—The Global Warning  24 April – 24 May 2008
 2008: Napapijri Gallery Milan, Italy Solo Show Antarctica  23 June 2008 – 15 September 2008
 2013: Bernheimer Gallery, Munich Germany A Million Faces of Ice March—April 2013
 2013: [Gagosian Gallery], Los Angeles, California B&W Ice exhibit to benefit the NRDC, October 2013
 2017: Lumière Center for Photography, Moscow Pure Arctic Retrospective of more than 50 works 21 September 2017 – 7 January 2018
 2018: Camera Work Gallery, Berlin "Sebastian Copeland" 19 October 2018 – 1 December 2018

See also
List of polar explorers

Bibliography
 Antarctica: The Global Warning 2007  Palace Press International  (French translation Intervista; Spanish Lunwerg and German Rolf Heyne; Australia The Five Mile Press)
 Antarctica: A Call To Action 2008  Palace Press International
 Water 2008 – Prix Pictet Editions TeNeues
 The Call Of The Poles 2009 (Introduction) Le Cercle Polaire Publishing
 Commitment: When The World Must Come Together As One 2009 (Essay) Edition Electa
 Arctica: The Vanishing North 2015 TeNeues Publishing
Antarctica: The Waking Giant 2020 Rizzoli Publishing (Introduction by Leonardo DiCaprio)

References

Living people
UCLA Film School alumni
American photographers
American environmentalists
Artists from Los Angeles
1964 births
Activists from California
Knights of the Ordre national du Mérite